The Dutch Basketball League (DBL), formerly the Eredivisie, was the highest professional basketball league in the Netherlands, run by the Federatie Eredivisie Basketball (FEB). Since 2021, the league has been replaced by the Belgian-Dutch BNXT League.

The league had a closed system: to participate, a team has to have enough money and potential. The league began in 1960 as the Eredivisie and was organized by the NBB and later the FEB. In 1977 the league introduced play-offs. As of 2019, the Dutch Basketball League consists of ten teams and plays under the FIBA rules.

History

2010s
Starting with the 2010–11 season, the Eredivisie changed its name to the Dutch Basketball League, shortly the DBL. The beginning of the 2010s saw Donar and ZZ Leiden emerge as top teams in the Netherlands. Donar won five titles, including three straight (2015-2018). The decade also saw clubs disappear due to financial problems, with Amsterdam in 2011, West-Brabant Giants in 2011,
Magixx in 2014. The decade also saw the emergence of new clubs in Apollo Amsterdam and Den Helder Suns.

In Europe, Donar had one of the biggest successes in Dutch history after reaching the semi-finals of the 2017–18 FIBA Europe Cup. It was the first European semi-final of a team since Amsterdam in 2001.

2020s
In December 2019, it was announced that the DBL has partnered with the Belgian Pro Basketball League (PBL) to look at the potential of a future "BeNe League". The 2019–20 season was cancelled prematurely in March because of the COVID-19 pandemic. It was the first time in league history that a season was not finished and no champions were named. Due to the pandemic, entry requirements for the following season were lowered which led to the entrance of Basketball Community Gelderland, The Hague Royals and Almere Sailors.

Format and rules
Each team has to play all the other teams in the league four times, twice at home and twice away. This means that the league's regular season ends after all teams play 36 matches. Like many other national domestic leagues in continental Europe, the Dutch Basketball League takes a winter break once each team has played half of its scheduled games.

Playoffs
At the end of the league season schedule, the eight best teams in the standings play in a play-off, pitting the first place team in the standings versus the eighth place team in the standings, and so on. The quarter finals are played in a best-of-three format and the semi-finals are played in a best-of-five format, and the finals are played in a best-of-seven format.

In seasons were the number of teams dropped to 9 or lower, six teams qualified for the playoffs. In this case, the numbers one and two qualified for the semifinals and the other four teams played the quarterfinals.

Foreign players
The DBL has had many rules in place to restrict the number of foreign players of clubs. This way the league seek to keep developing Dutch talent in the league. For several seasons.
Until 2019, teams in the DBL were not allowed to have more than four players without a Dutch passport in their on court team at the same time.
2015–2017: maximum 4 foreign players
2017–2019: maximum 5 foreign players (1 Dutch player at the court any time)
2019–2021: minimum of 6 home grown players

Logos

Clubs

Current clubs
As of the end of the 2020–21 season:

Timeline
The following is the timeline of the teams in the Dutch Basketball League era (since 2011).

 * – Indicates championship season

Former clubs

The following clubs are not competing in the DBL during the 2020–21 season, but have previously competed in the DBL for at least one season. Teams in italics were folded and do not exist anymore.

a: Founding member of the DBL.

Champions

Finals 

The two teams that advance to the Finals of the play-offs play against each other in a best-of-seven playoff format.

Performance by club 
Teams shown in italics are no longer in existence. Teams in bold are currently playing in the DBL.

Records

All-time scoring leaders 

The following are the ten players with the most points in the Eredivisie or DBL:

Awards

 Most Valuable Player
Playoffs MVP
All-Star Team 
Coach of the Year 
Defensive Player of the Year 
Most Improved Player
MVP Under U23 
Sixth Man of the Year
Rookie of the Year
All-Defense Team
All-Rookie Team
Statistical Player of the Year
All-Star Game MVP
All-Star Game U23 MVP

See also 
 Basketball Cup
 Dutch Basketball Supercup

References

External links

Official website 
DBL at Eurobasket.com

 
1
Professional sports leagues in the Netherlands